The Beverley 20 is a walk in the East Riding of Yorkshire that runs  between Beverley Minster and the Humber Bridge that pass through the local villages of Skidby and North Ferriby.  It also clips the edge of Walkington.

The paths themselves are also used by other longer routes.  The section from the Humber Bridge to North Ferriby is used by the Yorkshire Wolds Way, High Hunsley Circuit and the Trans Pennine Trail.

The Beverley 20 is the first stage of a four-part walk from The Humber Bridge to Filey, The East Riding Heritage Trail.

External links 

 Beverley 20 description from Walkingenglishman
 A photograph of part of the route leading west from Skidby

Footpaths in the East Riding of Yorkshire
Long-distance footpaths in England